The 13021 / 13022 Howrah Junction-Raxaul railway station Mithila Express is an Express train belonging to Indian Railways - Eastern Railway zone that runs between Howrah Junction and Raxaul railway station in India. 

It operates as train number 13021 from Howrah Junction to Raxaul railway station and as train number 13022 in the reverse direction serving the states of Bihar, Jharkhand & West Bengal. As Raxaul-Birgunj border is the main entry point to Nepal, Mithila express serves as one of the main rail links to Nepal as well.

Service

This train is reserved well ahead of its departure dates.

Coaches

The 13021 / 13022 Howrah Junction-Raxaul railway station "Mithila Express" consists with a total of 19 coaches of types 1AC 2-Tier, 4AC 3-Tier, 8 Sleeper, 4 General (Unreserved) and a Military coach (occasionally) 2 SLR. Sleeper Extra (SE) Coaches are attached during the time of festivals.

Routing

The 13021 / 13022 Howrah Junction-Raxaul railway station Mithila Express runs from Howrah Junction via Serampore →  Bandel → Barddhaman Junction → Durgapur → Raniganj → Asansol Junction → Chittaranjan → Madhupur → Jasidih → Jhajha → Kiul Junction → Barauni Junction → Samastipur Junction → Muzaffarpur Junction → Sagauli →  to Raxaul. It takes to much time to travels as there are to many stops so prefer other trains than this.

Traction

As the track between Muzaffarpur Junction and Raxaul has been electrified.. The journey is covered by an electric locomotive WAP 4
However the track doubling work between Muzaffarpur and Bapudham Motihari is under progress.

See also 

 Howrah Junction railway station
 Raxaul Junction railway station
 Howrah - Raxaul Express

References 

Rail transport in Howrah
Transport in Raxaul
Named passenger trains of India
Rail transport in Bihar
Rail transport in West Bengal
Rail transport in Jharkhand
Express trains in India